Rayne Johnson is an American country music singer. He is signed to Mountain Road Records and has charted on Billboard Country Airplay with the single "Front Seat".

Biography
Johnson was born in Fairfield, Ohio. He took musical inspiration from the music that his parents listened to, and in high school he began performing locally. At the end of the first decade of the 21st century, Johnson passed an audition for American Idol but was eliminated early in the proceedings. After the audition, he returned to Ohio and continued performing locally, which led to him serving as an opening act for several country artists including Kellie Pickler and Randy Houser. He also began recording demos for other artists, which led to him receiving a recording contract. Johnson released three singles between 2018 and 2020: "Lips Like Liquor", "Laid Back", and "Front Seat". The third of these was sent to country radio in 2020. "Front Seat" was met with positive reception: Taste of Country writer Billy Dukes stated that it was "an R&B-influenced, soon-to-be-love song that showcases his vocal passion" and "a metaphor for how a girl should be treated", while Markos Papadatos of Digital Journal called it a "polished, piano-laden ballad that really tugs at the heartstrings, and it has a stirring vibe to it." "Front Seat" entered the top 40 of Country Airplay in March 2020, and #46 on Hot Country Songs and has a music video.

Discography

Albums

Singles

References

21st-century American male musicians
American country singer-songwriters
Country musicians from Ohio
Country musicians from Tennessee
Living people
People from Fairfield, Ohio
Year of birth missing (living people)
American male singer-songwriters
Singer-songwriters from Tennessee
Singer-songwriters from Ohio